A deliberative assembly is a meeting of members who use parliamentary procedure.

Etymology
In a speech to the electorate at Bristol in 1774, Edmund Burke described the British Parliament as a "deliberative assembly," and the expression became the basic term for a body of persons meeting to discuss and determine common action.

Characteristics
Robert's Rules of Order Newly Revised by Henry Martyn Robert describes the following characteristics of a deliberative assembly:
 A group of people meets to discuss and make decisions on behalf of the entire membership.
 They meet in a single room or area, or under equivalent conditions of simultaneous oral communication.
 Each member is free to act according to their own judgement.
 Each member has an equal vote.
 The members at the meeting act for the entire group, even if there are members absent.
 A member's dissent on a particular issue constitutes neither a withdrawal from the group, nor a termination of membership.

Types
Robert's Rules of Order Newly Revised identifies several types of deliberative assemblies.

Mass meeting

A mass meeting, which is an unorganized group meeting open to all individuals in a sector of the population who are interested in deliberating about a subject proposed by the meeting's sponsors. Examples include meetings to discuss common political concerns or community interests, or meetings to form a new society.

Local assembly of an organized society

A local assembly of an organized society, which is a membership meeting of a local chapter or branch of a membership organization. Examples include local chapter meetings of organizations like the Sierra Club.

Convention

A convention, which is a meeting of delegates who represent constituent units of a population. Conventions are not permanently established bodies, and delegates are normally elected for only one term. A convention may be held by an organized society, where each local assembly is represented by a delegate.

Legislative body

A legislative body, which is a legally established public lawmaking body. It consists of representatives chosen by the electorate. Examples include national legislatures such as parliaments, and local government councils such as state legislatures, regional assemblies and city councils.

Board

A board, which is an administrative, managerial, or quasi-judicial body. A board derives its power from an outside authority that defines the scope of its operations. Examples include an organized society's or company's board of directors and government agency boards like a board of education.

Rights of members
A member of a deliberative assembly has the right to attend meetings, and make and second motions, speak in debate, and vote. Organizations may have different classes of members (such as regular members, active members, associate members, and honorary members), but the rights of each class of membership must be defined (such as whether a "member" in a class has the right to vote). There may also be ex officio members, or persons who are members by virtue of some other office or position they hold. Ex officio members have the same rights as other members.

See also
 Deliberation
 Deliberative democracy
 Direct democracy
 Meeting (parliamentary procedure)
 Voting methods in deliberative assemblies
 Legislative assembly
Committee

References

Citations

Sources 

 
 

Deliberative groups
Meetings
Parliamentary procedure